Shootflying Hill is a mountain in Barnstable County, Massachusetts. It is located north of Centerville in the Town of Barnstable. Clay Hill is located west and Cobbs Hill is located east-northeast of Shootflying Hill. Named for the early practice of Shooting geese and ducks as they passed over.

References

Mountains of Massachusetts
Mountains of Barnstable County, Massachusetts